P & K Enterprises, was an American manufacturer of composite and wooden propellers for homebuilt and ultralight aircraft. The company headquarters was located in Colfax, Indiana.

See also
List of aircraft propeller manufacturers

References 

Companies established in 1981
Aircraft propeller manufacturers
Aerospace companies of the United States